The following is a list of notable deaths in April 2011.

Entries for each day are listed alphabetically by surname. A typical entry lists information in the following sequence:
 Name, age, country of citizenship at birth, subsequent country of citizenship (if applicable), reason for notability, cause of death (if known), and reference.

April 2011

1
Peter Baumann, 75, Swiss psychiatrist.
Lou Gorman, 82, American baseball executive and general manager (Boston Red Sox, Seattle Mariners).
Jane Gregory, 51, British Olympic equestrian, heart attack.
George Gryaznov, 77, Russian Orthodox Archbishop of Chelyabinsk and Zlatoust (1989–1996), stroke.
Manning Marable, 60, American professor (Columbia University).
Edel Ojeda, 82, Mexican Olympic boxer.
Georgi Rusev, 82, Bulgarian theatre and film actor.
Siri Skare, 52, Norwegian lieutenant colonel, first Norwegian female military pilot.
Varkey Vithayathil, 83, Indian Syro-Malabar Catholic hierarch, Cardinal (from 2001), Major Archbishop of Ernakulam-Angamaly (from 1999).
Brynle Williams, 62, Welsh activist (fuel protests) and politician, AM for North Wales (from 2003).

2
Richard W. Bailey, 71, American linguist.
Larry Finch, 60, American basketball player and coach (Memphis Tigers).
John C. Haas, 92, American businessman (Rohm and Haas), natural causes.
Efraín Loyola, 94, Cuban flautist.
James McNulty, 92, Canadian politician, MP for Lincoln (1962–1968) and St. Catharines (1968–1972).
Jess Osuna, 82, American character actor (Three Days of the Condor).
Larry Parr, 64, American chess player.
Baba Reshat, 76, Albanian religious figure, head of the Bektashi order.
Tom Silverio, 65, Dominican-born American baseball player (California Angels).
Bill Varney, 77, American sound editor (Raiders of the Lost Ark, Back to the Future, Dune).
Romeo Venturelli, 72, Italian cyclist.
Paul Violi, 66, American poet, cancer.

3
Rafique Alam, 81, Indian politician, heart attack.
Amy Applegren, 84, American baseball player (All-American Girls Professional Baseball League).
Lena Lovato Archuleta, 90, American educator.
Ulli Beier, 88, German writer.
William Henry Bullock, 83, American Roman Catholic prelate, Bishop of Des Moines (1987–1993) and Madison (1993–2003), lung cancer.
James Martin Fitzgerald, 90, American jurist, justice of the Alaska Supreme Court (1972–1974), senior judge of the District Court for the District of Alaska (1974–2006).
Martin Horton, 76, English cricketer, after long illness.
Kevin Jarre, 56, American screenwriter (Tombstone, Glory, The Mummy), heart failure.
Yevgeny Lyadin, 84, Russian footballer.
Marian Pankowski, 91, Polish writer.
William Prusoff, 90, American pharmacologist.
Calvin Russell, 62, American protest singer-songwriter and guitarist.
Mandi Schwartz, 23, Canadian college ice hockey player, acute myeloid leukemia.
Gustavo Sondermann, 29, Brazilian racing driver, race crash.
John A. Tory, 81, Canadian lawyer and corporate executive, stroke.

4
John Adler, 51, American politician, U.S. Representative from New Jersey (2009–2011), infective endocarditis.
Scott Columbus, 54, American drummer (Manowar).
Jackson Lago, 76, Brazilian politician, Governor of Maranhão (2007–2009), cancer.
Ned McWherter, 80, American politician, Speaker of the Tennessee House of Representatives (1973–1987) and Governor (1987–1995), cancer.
Juliano Mer-Khamis, 52, Israeli actor and political activist, shot.
John Niven, 89, Scottish footballer (East Fife F.C.).
Witta Pohl, 73, German actress.
Wayne Robson, 64, Canadian actor (The Red Green Show).
Craig Thomas, 68, Welsh author, pneumonia.
Juan Tuñas, 93, Cuban footballer.
Vakur Versan, 93, Turkish jurist, professor of administrative law (Istanbul University).
Boško Vuksanović, 83, Croatian water polo player.

5
Baruch Samuel Blumberg, 85, American doctor, Nobel laureate in medicine, heart attack.
L. J. Davis, 70, American writer.
Heinrich Kleisli, 80, Swiss mathematician.
John Mahoney, 61, American politician.
Ange-Félix Patassé, 74, Central African politician, Prime Minister (1976–1978) and President (1993–2003).
Gil Robbins, 80, American folk singer (The Highwaymen) and actor, father of Tim Robbins, prostate cancer.
Larry Shepard, 92, American baseball manager (Pittsburgh Pirates) and coach (Cincinnati Reds).

6
Nabi Bakhsh Baloch, 93, Pakistani scholar.
Thøger Birkeland, 89, Danish children's book author.
Igor Birman, 85, Russian-born American writer and economist.
Jim Blair, 64, Scottish footballer, natural causes.
John Bottomley, 50, Canadian singer-songwriter, suicide.
Mike Campbell, 78, Zimbabwean farmer, challenged Robert Mugabe (Campbell v Zimbabwe), complications from torture.
Giuseppe Comini, 88, Italian Olympic fencer.
Joe Heap, 79, American football player (New York Giants).
Robin Lindsay, 97, British Olympic silver medal-winning (1948) field hockey player.
Coyote McCloud, 68, American disc jockey.
Johnny Morris, 87, English footballer.
Skip O'Brien, 60, American actor (CSI: Crime Scene Investigation, The Hitcher, Blow), complications from prostate cancer.
Fritiof S. Sjöstrand, 98, Swedish physician and histologist.
F. Gordon A. Stone, 85, British chemist.
Sujatha, 58, Indian actress.
Hans Tiedge, 73, German spy.

7
Benedetto Aloi, 75, American mobster, natural causes.
Bruce Cowan, 85, Australian politician, member of the House of Representatives (1980–1993).
Edward Edwards, 77, American serial killer, natural causes.
Hugh FitzRoy, 11th Duke of Grafton, 92, British aristocrat.
Pierre Gauvreau, 88, Canadian painter and television screenplay writer.
Blažena Holišová, 80, Czech film and theatre actress.
Arthur Lessac, 101, American voice trainer.
E. J. McGuire, 58, Canadian ice hockey coach and scout, cancer.
Hedzer Rijpstra, 91, Dutch politician.
Victor Surdu, 63, Romanian politician, first post-Communist Minister of Agriculture and Rural Development.

8
Freda Ahenakew, 79, Canadian author and academic.
Mario Branch, 31, American football player (Tennessee Titans, Amsterdam Admirals, Philadelphia Soul), heart failure.
Daniel Catán, 62, Mexican composer.
David S. Clarke, 69, Australian businessman, chairman of Macquarie Group (1985–2007), stomach cancer.
John McCracken, 76, American sculptor.
John Pugsley, 77, American libertarian speaker and writer.
Donald Shanks, 70, Australian operatic bass-baritone, heart attack.
Vasilijs Stepanovs, 83, Latvian weightlifter and Olympic silver medalist (1956 Melbourne).
Hedda Sterne, 100, Romanian-born American painter and printmaker.
Elena Zuasti, 75, Uruguayan stage actress and comedian, heart failure.

9
Zakariya Rashid Hassan al-Ashiri, 40, Bahraini blogger and journalist, beaten. 
Pierre Celis, 86, Belgian brewer (Celis), cancer.
Robert Coleman-Senghor, 71, American English professor, torn aorta.
Chip Fairway, 38, American wrestler.
Nicholas Goodhart, 91, British marine engineer and glider pilot.
Jerry Lawson, 70, American videogame console engineer.
Sidney Lumet, 86, American film director (12 Angry Men, Dog Day Afternoon, Network), lymphoma.
Roger Nichols, 66, American sound engineer and record producer (Steely Dan), pancreatic cancer.
Yolande Palfrey, 54, British actress (Blake's 7, Doctor Who), brain tumour.
Orrin Tucker, 100, American orchestra leader.
Randy Wood, 94, American record producer, founder of Dot Records.

10
Bill Brill, 79, American sportswriter and newspaper editor, esophageal cancer.
Violet Cowden, 94, American pilot, member of Women Airforce Service Pilots during World War II, heart failure.
Don Merton, 72, New Zealand conservationist.
Mikhail Rusyayev, 46, Russian footballer.
Bob Shaw, 89, American football player (Los Angeles Rams).
Homer Smith, 79, American football coach (Army Black Knights), cancer.
Phil Solomon, 86, Northern Irish music executive.
Francis E. Sweeney, 77, American jurist, Ohio Supreme Court justice (1993–2004).
Stephen Watson, 56, South African writer and critic, cancer.

11
Billy Bang, 63, American jazz violinist, lung cancer.
Lewis Binford, 80, American archaeologist, heart failure.
Jimmy Briggs, 74, Scottish footballer (Dundee United).
Akis Cleanthous, 47, Cypriot politician, chairman of the Stock Exchange (2003–2007), Minister of Education and Culture (2007–2008), heart attack.
John D'Orazio, 55, Australian politician, member of the Western Australian Legislative Assembly for Ballajura (2001–2008), heart attack during surgery.
La Esterella, 91, Belgian Flemish singer.
Billy Gray, 83, English footballer (Nottingham Forest).
Murtaza Hassan, Pakistani stage comedian, hepatitis and liver cancer.
Sir John Lowther, 87, British public servant, Lord Lieutenant of Northamptonshire (1984–1998).
Sir Simon Milton, 49, British politician, London Deputy Mayor for Policy and Planning, after short illness.
Doug Newlands, 79, Scottish footballer (Aberdeen, Burnley).
Jørgen Munk Plum, 85, Danish Olympic athlete.
Peter Ruehl, 64, American-born Australian columnist.
Igor Runov, 48, Russian volleyball player, Olympic silver medalist (1988).
Angela Scoular, 65, British actress, suicide by poisoning.
Larry Sweeney, 30, American professional wrestler and manager, suicide by hanging.
Eric Wall, 95, British Anglican bishop, Bishop of Huntingdon (1972–1980).

12
Roy Ananny, 86, Canadian football player.
Albert Bachmann, 81, Swiss military intelligence officer.
Sachin Bhowmick, 80, Indian screenwriter, heart attack.
Lee Bradley Brown, 39, British tourist, died in police custody in Dubai. 
Ronnie Coyle, 46, Scottish footballer (Celtic, Raith Rovers), leukemia.
Sidney Harman, 92, American businessman and publisher (Newsweek), acute myeloid leukemia.
Eddie Joost, 94, American baseball player and manager (Philadelphia Athletics, Cincinnati Reds).
Robert Lokossimbayé, 35, Chadian footballer.
Buster Martin, 104?, French-born British longevity claimant.
Aleksandar Petaković, 81, Serbian football player.
Jānis Polis, 72, Latvian pharmacologist, discovered rimantadine.
Ioan Şişeştean, 74, Romanian Catholic hierarch, Bishop of Maramureş (since 1994).
Désiré Tagro, 52, Ivorian politician, Interior Minister, chief of staff for Laurent Gbagbo, shot.
Miroslav Tichý, 84, Czech photographer.

13
Danny Fiszman, 66, British football director (Arsenal), cancer.
*Seeta bint Abdul Aziz, 80, Saudi royal, sister of King Abdullah, after long illness.

14
Rosihan Anwar, 88, Indonesian journalist, heart failure.
Trevor Bannister, 76, British actor (Are You Being Served?, Last of the Summer Wine, The Dustbinmen), heart attack.
Walter Breuning, 114, American supercentenarian, world's fifth oldest man ever.
George Brookes, 76, Australian politician, member of the Tasmanian Legislative Council (1991–1997).
Jon Cedar, 80, American character actor (Hogan's Heroes), leukemia.
Patrick Cullinan, 77, South African writer.
Louis Dufaux, 79, French Roman Catholic prelate, Bishop of Grenoble (1989–2006).
Bernie Flowers, 81, American football player (Baltimore Colts).
Joe Dan Gold, 68, American college basketball coach (Mississippi State).
Jean Gratton, 86, Canadian Roman Catholic prelate, Bishop of Mont-Laurier (1978–2001).
Cyrus Harvey, Jr., 85, American entrepreneur, stroke.
William Lipscomb, 91, American chemist, pneumonia.
Arthur Marx, 89, American writer, son of Groucho Marx.
Rami Reddy, 52, Indian actor, kidney failure.

15
Vittorio Arrigoni, 36, Italian activist, hanged.
Babu Baral, 47, Pakistani comedian, cancer.
Reno Bertoia, 76, Italian-born Canadian baseball player (Detroit Tigers, Minnesota Twins), lymphoma.
Walter Brown, 85, Australian Olympic bronze medal-winning (1956) canoer.
Elmer Carter, 100, American Negro league baseball player.
William Cook, 80, American entrepreneur, philanthropist and historic preservationist, heart failure.
Hélio Gueiros, 85, Brazilian politician, Governor of Pará (1987–1991), Mayor of Belém (1993–1996), renal disease.
Michael Hurley, 87, Irish Jesuit and ecumenical theologian, co-founder of the Irish School of Ecumenics.
Hans Kohler, 81, Swiss Olympic weightlifter.
Vincenzo La Scola, 53, Italian tenor, heart attack.
Bobo Osborne, 75, American baseball player (Detroit Tigers).
Beryl Shipley, 84, American basketball coach (University of Louisiana at Lafayette, San Diego Conquistadors).
E. T. York, 88, American agronomist, educator and presidential adviser.

16
Gerry Alexander, 82, Jamaican cricketer.
Bijan, 67, Iranian-born American fashion designer, stroke.
Allan Blakeney, 85, Canadian politician, Premier of Saskatchewan (1971–1982), complications from liver cancer. 
Auguste Caulet, 84, French Olympic boxer.
Chinesinho, 76, Brazilian footballer, Alzheimer's disease.
Stanley Glenn, 84, American baseball player and executive (Negro league baseball).
Bjørn Oscar Gulbrandsen, 85, Norwegian Olympic ice hockey player and sailor.
Bill Kinnamon, 91, American Major League Baseball umpire.
Serge LeClerc, 61, Canadian pardoned criminal and politician, MLA for Saskatoon Northwest (2007–2010), complications from colon and bowel cancer.
Alfonso Martínez, 74, Spanish Olympic basketball player
Tadeusz Pawlusiak, 64, Polish Olympic ski jumper.
William A. Rusher, 87, American columnist, publisher of National Review (1957–1988).
Dan Monroe Russell, Jr., 98, American senior (former chief) judge of the District Court for the Southern District of Mississippi, natural causes.
Sol Saks, 100, American screenwriter (Bewitched).
Hermod Skånland, 85, Norwegian Central Bank governor (1985–1993).
Harold Volkmer, 80, American politician, U.S. Representative from Missouri (1977–1997), pneumonia.

17
Nasser Al-Kharafi, 67, Kuwaiti businessman (M. A. Kharafi & Sons), heart attack.
James S. Albus, 75, American engineer.
Bob Block, 89, British comedy writer (Rentaghost, Life with The Lyons).
Joel Colton, 92, American historian, heart failure.
Osamu Dezaki, 67, Japanese animator (Space Adventure Cobra, Tomorrow's Joe), lung cancer.
Alfred Freedman, 94, American psychiatrist, led American Psychiatric Association to declassify homosexuality as a mental illness, complications following hip surgery.
Eric Gross, 84, Austrian-born Australian composer.
Alan Haines, 86, British actor.
Wolfram Koppen, 72, German Olympic judoka.
Josefa Köster, 92, German Olympic sprint canoer.
Eddie Leadbeater, 83, English cricketer, after short illness.
Oldřich Lomecký, 90, Czech Olympic sprint canoer.
Blair Milan, 29, Australian actor and television presenter, acute myeloid leukaemia.
Nikos Papazoglou, 63, Greek singer-songwriter, cancer.
AJ Perez, 18, Filipino actor, traffic accident.
Raúl Sánchez Díaz Martell, 96, Mexican politician, Governor of Baja California (1965–1971).
Michael Sarrazin, 70, Canadian actor (They Shoot Horses, Don't They?; The Flim-Flam Man; For Pete's Sake), cancer.
Bhawani Singh, 79, Indian noble, titular Maharaja of Jaipur (since 1970).
Dennis E. Stowell, 66, American politician, member of the Utah State Senate (2007–2011), cancer.
Ken Taylor, 88, British television scriptwriter (The Jewel in the Crown).
Robert Vickrey, 84, American artist.
Victor Ward, 87, Canadian miner, survivor of the 1956 Springhill Mine disaster, after long illness.

18
Olubayo Adefemi, 25, Nigerian footballer, car accident.
Sadiq Ali, 58, Indian politician.
Pietro Ferrero Jr., 47, Italian businessman (Ferrero SpA), bicycle accident.
Kjell Håkonsen, 75, Norwegian harness racer and trainer.
Bob Plant, 95, British soldier, recipient of the Military Cross.
Mason Rudolph, 76, American golfer.
Giovanni Saldarini, 86, Italian cardinal, Archbishop of Turin (1989–1999), natural causes.
William Donald Schaefer, 89, American politician, Governor of Maryland (1987–1995), pneumonia.
Israpil Velijanov, 42, Russian Dagastani militant leader.
Ivica Vidović, 72, Croatian actor, after long illness.
Kim Yu-ri, 21, South Korean fashion model, apparent suicide.

19
Anne Blonstein, 52, British poet.
Lynn Chandnois, 86, American football player (Pittsburgh Steelers).
Lisa Head, 29, British soldier, improvised explosive device.
Richard P. Klocko, 96, American Air Force lieutenant general.
Jeanne M. Leiby, 46, American writer and magazine editor, car accident.
Norm Masters, 77, American football player (Green Bay Packers), cancer.
Aage Møst, 87, Norwegian sports official, President of the Norwegian Athletics Association (1956–1965).
Serge Nubret, 72, French bodybuilder and actor (Pumping Iron).
Elisabeth Sladen, 65, British actress (Doctor Who, The Sarah Jane Adventures), pancreatic cancer.
Grete Waitz, 57, Norwegian marathon former world record holder, 1983 world champion and Olympic silver medallist (1984), cancer.

20
Allan Brown, 84, Scottish football player and manager (Blackpool, Scotland).
Tim Hetherington, 40, British photojournalist and filmmaker (Restrepo), mortar attack.
Rudolf Hilf, 83, German historian, political scientist and expellee politician.
Chris Hondros, 41, American photojournalist, mortar attack.
Osvaldo Miranda, 95, Argentine actor (Cita en las estrellas).
Patricia Ofori, 29, Ghanaian international footballer (2003 & 2007 FIFA Women's World Cup), traffic collision.
Madelyn Pugh, 90, American screenwriter (I Love Lucy, The Mothers-in-Law) and producer (Alice).
Tul Bahadur Pun, 88, Nepali World War II veteran, recipient of the Victoria Cross, cardiac complications.
Ted Quillin, 81, American radio personality.
Hubert Schlafly, 91, American engineer, co-inventor of the TelePrompter.
Kerry Smith, 58, New Zealand actress and broadcaster, melanoma.
Erwin Strahl, 82, Austrian actor.

21
Javier Adúriz, 63, Argentine poet.
Beverly Barton, 64, American romance author, heart failure.
Tine Bryld, 71, Danish social worker, writer, radio host and letters editor.
Annalisa Ericson, 97, Swedish actress (Summer Interlude).
Helen J. Frye, 80, American federal judge, after long illness.
Reginald C. Fuller, 102, British Roman Catholic priest and author.
Harold Garfinkel, 93, American sociologist.
W. J. Gruffydd, 94, Welsh poet.
Catharina Halkes, 90, Dutch theologian and feminist
Jim Heise, 80, American baseball player (Washington Senators), complications from surgery.
Jess Stonestreet Jackson, Jr., 81, American wine entrepreneur, founder of Kendall-Jackson, cancer.
Ken Kostick, 57, Canadian cooking show host (What's for Dinner?), complications of pancreatitis.
Max Mathews, 84, American engineer and computer music composer, complications from pneumonia.
Muhannad, 41, Saudi al Qaeda fighter in Chechnya, shot.
Yoshiko Tanaka, 55, Japanese actress (Godzilla vs. Biollante) and singer (Candies), breast cancer.
Walter van de Walle, 88, Canadian politician, MP for Pembina (1986–1988) and St. Albert (1988–1993).

22
Anthony Abrahams, 87, British barrister and educationalist.
Moin Akhter, 60, Pakistani actor and comedian, heart attack.
Patrick Billingsley, 85, American mathematician and actor.
*Cheung Sai Ho, 35, Hong Kong footballer, suicide by jumping.
Wiel Coerver, 86, Dutch footballer and manager.
Eldon Davis, 94, American architect, creator of Googie architecture, founder of Armet & Davis.
Hazel Dickens, 85, American bluegrass singer.
Madhava Gudi, 70, Indian Hindustani classical vocalist.
Siarhei Lahun, 22, Belarusian weightlifter, car accident.
Sidney Michaels, 83, American playwright and screenwriter (The Night They Raided Minsky's), Alzheimer's disease.
Merle Greene Robertson, 97, American artist and archeologist.
José Antonio Torres Martinó, 94, Puerto Rican painter and writer, after long illness.
João Maria Tudela, 81, Portuguese singer.

23
Mushtaq Ahmad, 82, Pakistani Olympic gold medal-winning (1960) field hockey player.
Ed Austin, 84, American attorney and politician, Mayor of Jacksonville, Florida (1991–1995).
Dmytro Blazheyovskyi, 100, Ukrainian priest, historian and embroiderer.
Ghafoor Butt, 74, Pakistani cricketer and umpire.
James Casey, 88, British comedian.
Bill Flynn, 59, Australian politician, member of the Legislative Assembly of Queensland for Lockyer (2001–2004), parliamentary leader of One Nation (2001–2004).
Sid Fournet, 78, American football player (New York Jets, Pittsburgh Steelers).
David Hackett, 84, American government official (President's Committee on Juvenile Delinquency and Youth Crime, 1961–1964), complications of diabetes.
Tom King, 68, American guitarist and songwriter (The Outsiders), heart failure.
Peter Li Hongye, 91, Chinese underground Roman Catholic prelate, clandestine bishop of Luoyang.
Peter Lieberson, 64, American composer, complications of lymphoma.
Terence Longdon, 88, British actor.
Huey P. Meaux, 82, American record producer.
Milorad Bata Mihailović, 88, Serbian painter.
Noxolo Nogwaza, 24, South African lesbian activist, stabbed.
Norio Ohga, 81, Japanese businessman, president and CEO of Sony, multiple organ failure.
Ready Teddy, 23, New Zealand eventing horse, complications from colic.
Geoffrey Russell, 4th Baron Ampthill, 89, British politician.
Mohammad Abdus Sattar, 85, Indian Olympic footballer, pneumonia.
Phillip Shriver, 88, American historian and college administrator.
Max van der Stoel, 86, Dutch politician and diplomat, Minister of Foreign Affairs (1973–1977, 1981–1982).
John Sullivan, 64, British writer (Only Fools and Horses), viral pneumonia.
Dutch Tilders, 69, Australian blues musician, cancer.

24
Otto Amen, 98, American politician.
Sathya Sai Baba, 84, Indian spiritual guru, founder of the Sathya Sai Organization, multiple organ failure.
Nawang Gombu, 74, Tibetan-born Indian mountaineer, after short illness.
Peter Green, 91, Canadian Olympic rower.
Alimirah Hanfere, 95, Ethiopian sultan of the Aussa Sultanate.
José López, 88, Chilean footballer 
Sir Denis Mahon, 100, British art historian and philanthropist.
Madame Nhu, 87, South Vietnamese First Lady (1955–1963), after short illness.
Joan Peyser, 80, American musicologist, after heart surgery.
Marie-France Pisier, 66, French actress (The Other Side of Midnight), drowning.
Colin Snedden, 93, New Zealand cricketer.

25
Winrich Behr, 93, German World War II Panzer captain, recipient of the Knight's Cross of the Iron Cross.
Ira Cohen, 76, American poet, renal failure.
John Cooke, 89, British air marshal.
William Craig, 86, Northern Irish politician, founder of Vanguard Unionist Progressive Party, MP for Belfast East (1974–1979).
Abdoulaye Hamani Diori, 65, Nigerien politician, after long illness.
María Isbert, 94, Spanish actress.
Lawrence Lee, 101, British stained glass artist.
Ryszard Nawrocki, 71, Polish actor and voice actor.
Joe Perry, 84, American football player (San Francisco 49ers), member of the Pro Football Hall of Fame.
*Poly Styrene, 53, British musician (X-Ray Spex), breast cancer.
Gonzalo Rojas, 93, Chilean poet.
Güven Sazak, 76, Turkish businessman, chairman of Fenerbahçe S.K. (1993–1994).
Minoru Tanaka, 44, Japanese actor (Ultraman Mebius & Ultraman Brothers, Kamen Rider W Returns – Kamen Rider Accel), suspected suicide by hanging.
Avraham Tiar, 87, Israeli politician, member of the Knesset (1961–1969).
Bobby Thompson, 57, American baseball player (Texas Rangers).
Elizabeth Wicken, 83, Canadian baseball player (All-American Girls Professional Baseball League).

26
Vic Atkinson, 90, Australian footballer.
Douglas Chaffee, 75, American artist.
John Cossette, 54, American television producer (Grammy Awards).
Roger Gimbel, 86, American Emmy Award-winning television producer (Chernobyl: The Final Warning, S.O.S. Titanic), pneumonia.
Lynn Hauldren, 89, American copywriter and product spokesperson (Empire Carpet).
José María Izuzquiza Herranz, 85, Spanish-born Peruvian Roman Catholic prelate, Vicar Apostolic of Jaén en Peru (1987–2001).
Sir Henry Leach, 87, British admiral.
Jim Mandich, 62, American football player and announcer (Miami Dolphins), bile duct cancer.
Don Miles, 75, American baseball player (Los Angeles Dodgers).
Islwyn Morris, 90, Welsh actor.
*Sadler's Wells, 30, American racehorse and sire.
Phoebe Snow, 60, American singer-songwriter ("Poetry Man"), brain hemorrhage.
Hector Sutherland, 81, Australian cyclist.
Samuel Zoll, 76, American jurist and politician, Mayor of Salem, Massachusetts (1970–1973), gallbladder cancer.

27
Orlando Bosch, 84, Cuban exile, after long illness.
Ibrahim Coulibaly, 47, Ivorian militia leader.
Paul Vincent Donovan, 86, American Roman Catholic prelate, Bishop of Kalamazoo (1971–1994).
Jack H. Goaslind, 83, American leader in the Church of Jesus Christ of Latter-day Saints.
Igor Kon, 82, Russian philosopher, psychologist and sexologist.
Rafael Menjívar Ochoa, 51, Salvadoran writer, journalist and translator, cancer.
Marian Mercer, 75, American actress (It's a Living), complications from Alzheimer's disease.
Mel Pearce, 83, Australian Olympic hockey player.
Dag Stokke, 44, Norwegian keyboardist (TNT), church organist and mastering engineer, cancer.
Harold Schnitzer, 87, American philanthropist and company executive (Schnitzer Steel), cancer.
Harry Thuillier, 85, Irish Olympic fencer and radio presenter.
Yvette Vickers, 81–82, American actress (Attack of the 50 Foot Woman), singer and model (Playboy). (body discovered on this date)
Willem Albert Wagenaar, 69, Dutch psychologist.
Michael Waltman, 64, American actor (Beyond the Law, Tower of Terror, National Lampoon's Van Wilder).
David Wilkerson, 79, American Christian evangelist and author (The Cross and the Switchblade), car accident.

28
Enrique Arancibia Clavel, 66, Chilean DINA agent.
William Campbell, 87, American film and television actor (Love Me Tender, Star Trek, Dementia 13).
Gene Fekete, 88, American football player (Cleveland Browns).
Erhard Loretan, 52, Swiss mountaineer, third climber to scale all 14 eight-thousanders, climbing accident.
Willie O'Neill, 70, Scottish football player (Celtic).
E. Earl Patton, 83, American businessman and politician, tornado.
Wilhelm Weidenbrück, 96, German Knight's Cross of the Iron Cross recipient.

29
Waldemar Baszanowski, 75, Polish weightlifter.
Robert B. Duncan, 90, American politician, U.S. Representative from Oregon (1963–1967, 1975–1981).
Asker Dzhappuyev, 40, Russian militant leader (Yarmuk Jamaat), shot.
George Wolfgang Forell, 91, German-born American Christian scholar.
Salim Ghazal, 79, Syrian-born Lebanese Melkite Catholic hierarch, Curial bishop of Antioch for Melkites (2001–2005).
Abdul Hameed, 83, Pakistani writer and novelist.
Jeff Kargola, 27, American freestyle motocross rider, race accident.
Vladimir Krainev, 67, Russian pianist, People's Artist of the USSR, aortic aneurysm.
David Mason, 85, British trumpeter, played trumpet solo on "Penny Lane", leukemia.
Siamak Pourzand, 79, Iranian journalist and dissident, suicide by jumping.
Joanna Russ, 74, American science fiction author, following a series of strokes.
Walter Santoro, 89, Uruguayan politician, Minister of Industry (1963–1964), natural causes.
Ratmir Shameyev, 22, Kabardin militant, shot.

30
Ronald Asmus, 53, American diplomat and political analyst, cancer.
Saif al-Arab Gaddafi, 28–29, Libyan soldier, son of Muammar Gaddafi, airstrike.
Pete Gray, 30, Australian environmental activist, bowel cancer.
Richard Holmes, 65, British military historian.
Dorjee Khandu, 56, Indian Chief Minister of Arunachal Pradesh (since 2007), helicopter crash.
Mike Krsnich, 79, American baseball player (Milwaukee Braves).
Francis Lü Shouwang, 45, Chinese Roman Catholic Bishop of Yichang, pancreatitis.
Anthony Francis Mestice, 87, American Roman Catholic prelate, Auxiliary Bishop of New York (1973–2001).
Harry S. Morgan, 65, German pornographic actor, producer and director. (body found on this date)
Emilio Navarro, 105, Puerto Rican Negro league baseball player.
Evald Okas, 95, Estonian painter.
Daniel Quillen, 70, American mathematician.
Ernesto Sabato, 99, Argentine writer (El Túnel, On Heroes and Tombs), pneumonia.
Edgar Seymour, 98, American Olympic bobsledder.
Apostolos Santas, 89, Greek Resistance veteran.
Eddie Turnbull, 88, Scottish football player and manager.

References

2011-04
 04